Barf may refer to:

 Vomiting (medically, emesis)
 Barf (album), a 2000 album by Farhad Mehrad
 Barf (Lake District), a hill in Cumbria, England
 Barf, a half-man, half-dog character in the 1987 comic sci-fi movie Spaceballs

BARF may refer to:
 BARF (Biologically Appropriate Raw Food) Diet, bones and raw food diet for pets
 Tetrakis[3,5-bis(trifluoromethyl)phenyl]borate the non-coordinating tetra-aryl borate anion [B[3,5-(CF3)2C6H3]4]−, commonly abbreviated as [BArF4]−
 Found also in Brookhart's acid
 Bay Area Renters Federation, a political advocacy group in San Francisco

See also
 Vomit (disambiguation)
 Barfe